Carriker's round-eared bat (Lophostoma carrikeri) is a bat species found in Bolivia, Brazil, Colombia, Guyana, Peru, Suriname and Venezuela. It was discovered by and named for Melbourne A. Carriker, Jr.

References

Bats of South America
Bats of Brazil
Mammals of Colombia
Mammals described in 1910
Lophostoma